Herbert Willibald Bernhard von Petersdorff (2 January 1882 in Berlin – 5 July 1964 in Darmstadt) was a German swimmer who competed in the 1900 Summer Olympics. He was a member of the German swimming team, which won the gold medal at the Paris Games. He was born in Berlin.

References

External links
 
 Herbert von Petersdorff's profile at databaseOlympics

1882 births
1964 deaths
Swimmers from Berlin
German male freestyle swimmers
German male water polo players
Olympic swimmers of Germany
Swimmers at the 1900 Summer Olympics
Olympic gold medalists for Germany
Medalists at the 1900 Summer Olympics
Olympic gold medalists in swimming
Water polo players at the 1900 Summer Olympics
19th-century German people
20th-century German people